The 2019 Men's EuroHockey Championship III was the 8th edition of the men's EuroHockey Championship III, the third level of the European field hockey Championships organized by the European Hockey Federation.

It was held from 28 July to 3 August 2019 in Gibraltar. The tournament also served as a qualifier for the 2021 EuroHockey Championship II, with the finalists Croatia and Switzerland qualifying.

Croatia won their first EuroHockey Championship III title by defeating Switzerland 5–4 in the final. The hosts Gibraltar won the bronze medal by defeating Portugal 7–2.

Qualified teams
The following eight teams, shown with pre-tournament world rankings, competed in the tournament.

Results
''All times are local (UTC+2).

Preliminary round

Pool A

Pool B

Fifth to eighth place classification

Pool C
The points obtained in the preliminary round against the other team are taken over.

First to fourth place classification

Semi-finals

Third and fourth place

Final

Statistics

Final standings

 Promoted to the EuroHockey Championship II

 Relegated to the EuroHockey Championship IV

Goalscorers

See also
2019 Men's EuroHockey Championship II
2019 Men's EuroHockey Championship IV
2019 Women's EuroHockey Championship III

References

EuroHockey Championship III
International sports competitions hosted by Gibraltar
Men 3
EuroHockey Championship III Men
EuroHockey Championship III Men
EuroHockey Championship III Men